The Dalles Carnegie Library is a historic former library building located in The Dalles, Oregon, United States. It is one of the thousands of libraries whose construction was funded by Andrew Carnegie. The construction grant of $10,000 was approved in March 1907, and it was dedicated in September 1910.

The building was used as the local public library until September 1966. In 1967 the building was leased from the city and converted into an art center. In 1997 the city deeded the building The Dalles Art Association, which continues the building's arts function. The building was added to the National Register of Historic Places in 1978.

There is a hip roof and tall brick chimneys with flared tops extending above the eaves. The building remains much as it was when constructed, with extensive original trim, a fireplace on the south wall upstairs, large windows, and the integrity of the exterior appearance is intact. Some minor modifications, including a small office and kitchenette have been added in the southwest corner upstairs.

See also
National Register of Historic Places listings in Wasco County, Oregon

References

External links

The Dalles Art Center official website
The Dalles-Wasco County Public Library official website

1910 establishments in Oregon
Arts centers in Oregon
Buildings and structures in The Dalles, Oregon
Carnegie libraries in Oregon
Former library buildings in the United States
Libraries established in 1910
Library buildings completed in 1910
National Register of Historic Places in Wasco County, Oregon
Tourist attractions in Wasco County, Oregon
Libraries on the National Register of Historic Places in Oregon
Historic district contributing properties in Oregon